Howard Livingston (May 15, 1922 – July 27, 1994) was an American football running back and defensive back in the National Football League for the New York Giants, Washington Redskins, San Francisco 49ers, and the Chicago Bears.  He played college football at Fullerton College.

His brother Cliff Livingston (1930–2010) also played in the NFL.

1922 births
1994 deaths
Players of American football from Los Angeles
American football running backs
New York Giants players
Washington Redskins players
San Francisco 49ers players
Chicago Bears players
Fullerton Hornets football players